Seafield Hospital is a  community hospital in Buckie, Morayshire, Scotland. It is managed by NHS Grampian.

History
The hospital was officially opened as Rathven Parish Hospital in 1911. It was expanded in 1919 and 1930 and, after joining the National Health Service in 1948, it was extended again in 1964. By this time the hospital was known as Seafield Hospital. It was  refurbished in 2001 and the front doors were replaced in 2004.

Services
Seafield Hospital has 32 beds providing medical care, rehabilitation, assessment, palliative/terminal care, convalescence and respite care. There is also a minor injuries unit.

References

NHS Grampian
NHS Scotland hospitals
Hospital buildings completed in 1911
Hospital buildings completed in 1919
Hospital buildings completed in 1930
Hospital buildings completed in 1964
Hospitals in Moray
1911 establishments in Scotland